The 2018 BYU Cougars baseball team represents Brigham Young University in the 2018 NCAA Division I baseball season.  Mike Littlewood acts in his sixth season as head coach of the Cougars. The Cougars overcame all expectations in 2017 and claimed a tri-team championship in the regular season. Afterwards the Cougars won the West Coast Conference tournament for the first time in their history, claiming the conferences automatic bid to the NCAA Tournament, the Cougars first tournament berth since 2002. The Cougars were placed in the Stanford Regional where they would go 1–2. The Cougars finished the season 38–21. For 2018 BYU was picked to finish first in the WCC Pre-season rankings.

2018 Roster

Schedule 

! style="background:#FFFFFF;color:#002654;"| Regular Season
|- 

|- align="center" bgcolor="ccffcc"
| February 16 || at CSUN || – || Matador Field  || Big West TV || 5–3 || Jake Suddreth (1–0) || Matt Acosta (0–1) || Riley Gates (1) || 512 || 1–0 || –
|- align="center" bgcolor="ffbbb"
| February 17 || at CSUN || – || Matador Field || Facebook || 9–10 || Hayden Shenefield (1–0) || Drew Zimmerman (0–1) || None || 451 || 1–1 || –
|- align="center" bgcolor="ccffcc"
| February 17 || at CSUN || – || Matador Field  || Facebook || 6–5 || Hayden Rogers (1–0) || Wesley Moore (0–1) || Riley Gates (2) || 590 || 2–1 || –
|- align="center" bgcolor="ccffcc"
| February 19 || at CSUN || – || Matador Field  || Big West TV || 10–8 || Bo Burrup (1–0) || Matt Acosta (0–2) ||  || 276 || 3–1 || –
|- align="center" bgcolor="ffbbb"
| February 22 || at Hawai'i || – || Les Murakami Stadium  || Facebook || 2–3 || Kyle Hatton (1–0) || Blake Inouye (0–1) || Dylan Thomas (3) || 2,211 || 3–2 || –
|- align="center" bgcolor="ccffcc"
| February 23 || at Hawai'i || – || Les Murakami Stadium  || Facebook || 4–3 (10) || Riley Gates (1–0) || Colin Ashworth (0–1) || Jake Suddreth (1) || 2,804 || 4–2 || –
|- align="center" bgcolor="ccffcc"
| February 24 || at Hawai'i || – || Les Murakami Stadium  || Facebook || 4–3 || Hayden Rogers (2–0) || Neil Uskali (1–1) || Jake Suddreth (2) || 2,757 || 5–2 || –
|- align="center" bgcolor="ffbbb"
| February 24 || at Hawai'i || – || Les Murakami Stadium  || Facebook || 3–8 || Logan Pouelsen (1–0) || Kenny Saenz (0–1) || None || 2,757 || 5–3 || –
|-

|- align="center" bgcolor="ffbbb"
| March 2 || at #18 Auburn || – || Plainsman Park  || SEC+ || 3–4 || Casey Mize (3–0) || Jordan Wood (0–1) || Calvin Coker (2) || 3,401 || 5–4 || –
|- align="center" bgcolor="ffbbb"
| March 3 || at #18 Auburn || – || Plainsman Park  || Facebook || 4–21 || Daniel Davis (2–0) || Hayden Rogers (2–1) || None || 4,021 || 5–5 || –
|- align="center" bgcolor="ffbbb"
| March 3 || at #18 Auburn || – || Plainsman Park  || Facebook || 5–9 || Tanner Burns (2–0) || Kenny Saenz (0–2) || Cody Greenhill (2) || 4,021 || 5–6 || –
|- align="center" bgcolor="ccffcc"
| March 8 || Omaha || – || Larry H. Miller Field  || TheW.tv || 8–1 || Jordan Wood (1–1) || Grant Suponchick (1–1)  || None || 1,288 || 6–6 || –
|- align="center" bgcolor="ccffcc"
| March 9 || Omaha || – || Larry H. Miller Field  || TheW.tv || 13–3 || Blake Inouye (1–1) || Joey Machado (0–3) || None || 1,362 || 7–6 || –
|- align="center" bgcolor="ccffcc"
| March 10 || Omaha || – || Larry H. Miller Field  || BYUtv || 6–4 || Drew Zimmerman (1–1) || Jake Pennington (2–2) || Jake Suddreth (3) || 1,731 || 8–6 || –
|- align="center" bgcolor="ccffcc"
| March 13 || Utah Valley || – || Larry H. Miller Field  || BYUtv || 9–3 || Kenny Saenz (1–2) || Marco Briones (0–1)  || None || 1,743 || 9–6 || –
|- align="center" bgcolor="ffbbb"
| March 15/16 ||  || – || Larry H. Miller Field  || TheW.tv || 4–7 || Matt Voelker (1–1) || Blake Inouye (1–2) || None || 1,652 || 9–7 || 0–1
|- align="center" bgcolor="ffbbb"
| March 16 || || – || Larry H. Miller Field  || TheW.tv || 8–9 (12) || Josh Robbins (1–1) || Jake Suddreth (1–1) || None || 1,652 || 9–8 || 0–2
|- align="center" bgcolor="ffbbb"
| March 17 ||  || – || Larry H. Miller Field  || BYUtv || 4–9 || Nick Frasso (2–2) || Hayden Rogers (2–2) || None || 1,110 || 9–9 || 0–3
|- align="center" bgcolor="ccffcc"
| March 20 || Utah || – || Larry H. Miller Field  || BYUtv || 7–6 (10) || Jake Suddreth (2–1) || Trenton Stolz (0–1) || None || 1,902 || 10–9 || –
|- align="center" bgcolor="ccffcc"
| March 22 || Gonzaga* || – || Larry H. Miller Field  || ESPNU || 6–4 || Jordan Wood (2–1) || Alex Jacob (1–3) || Drew Zimmerman (2) || 955 || 11–9  || 1–3
|- align="center" bgcolor="ccffcc"
| March 23 || Gonzaga* || – || Larry H. Miller Field  || BYUtv || 6–2 || Hayden Rogers (3–2) || Daniel Bies (3–2) || None || 1,587 || 12–9  || 2–3
|- align="center" bgcolor="ffbbb"
| March 24 || Gonzaga* || – || Larry H. Miller Field || BYUtv || 3–4 || Casey Legumina (2–1) || Bo Burrup (1–1) || None || 1,668 || 12–10 || 2–4
|- align="center" bgcolor="ccffcc"
| March 27 || at Utah Valley || – || UCCU Ballpark  || UVUtvWAC DN || 14–2 || Kendall Motes (1–0) || Paxton Schultz (1–2) || None || 2,108 || 13–10 || –
|- align="center" bgcolor="ffbbb"
| March 29 || at Pepperdine* || – || Eddy D. Field Stadium  || TheW.tv || 0–2 || Wil Jensen (5–0) || Jordan Wood (2–2) || Jordan Qsar (2)  || 307 || 13–11 || 2–5
|- align="center" bgcolor="ccffcc"
| March 30 || at Pepperdine* || – || Eddy D. Field Stadium  || TheW.tv || 13–6 || Hayden Rogers (4–2) || Christian Stotland (3–1) || Drew Zimmerman (3)  || 357 || 14–11 || 3–5
|- align="center" bgcolor="ffbbb"
| March 31 || at Pepperdine* || – || Eddy D. Field Stadium  || TheW.tv || 2–5 || Jonathan Pendergast (1–4) || Blake Inouye (1–3) || Jordan Qsar (3) || 413 || 14–12 || 3–6
|-

|- align="center" bgcolor="ffbbb"
| April 3 || at Utah || – || Smith's Ballpark  || P12 MTN || 3–4 || Josh Lapiana (1–2)  || Jake Suddreth (2–2)  || Trenton Stoltz (2) || 2,920 || 14–13 || –
|- align="center" bgcolor="ccffcc"
| April 5 || Santa Clara* || – || Larry H. Miller Field  || BYUtv || 2–1 || Drew Zimmerman (2–1) || Eric Lex (2–4) || None || 1,717 || 15–13  || 4–6
|- align="center" bgcolor="ccffcc"
| April 6 || Santa Clara* || – || Larry H. Miller Field  || TheW.tv || 6–4 (10) || Bo Burrup (2–1) || Michael Praszker (0–1) || None || 1,821 || 16–13 || 5–6
|- align="center" bgcolor="ccffcc"
| April 6 || Santa Clara* || – || Larry H. Miller Field  || TheW.tv || 6–5 || Rhett Parinkson (1–0) || Alex Waldsmith (0–4) || None || 1,821 || 17–13  || 6–6
|- align="center" bgcolor="ffbbb"
| April 12 || at Portland* || – || Joe Etzel Field  || TheW.tv || 3–4 || Christian Peters (1–0) || Jordan Wood (2–3) || Connor Knutson (5) || 242 || 17–14  || 6–7
|- align="center" bgcolor="ccffcc"
| April 13 || at Portland* || – || Joe Etzel Field  || TheW.tv || 6–2 || Hayden Rogers (5–2) || Eli Morse (2–5) || None || 302 || 18–14 || 7–6
|- align="center" bgcolor="ffbbb"
| April 14 || at Portland* || – || Joe Etzel Field  || TheW.tv || 6–8 || Tate Budnick (2–1) || Justin Sterner (0–1) || Connor Knutson (6) || 284 || 18–15  || 7–7
|- align="center" bgcolor="ffbbb"
| April 17 || at Arizona || – || Hi Corbett Field  || P12 || 1–6 || Juan Aguilera (5–0) || Jordan Wood (2–4) || None || 2,471 || 18–16 || –
|- align="center" bgcolor="ffbbb"
| April 24 || Utah || – || Larry H. Miller Field  || KBYU || 4–8 || Spencer Kevin Johnson (1–0) || Rhett Parkinson (1–1) || None || 2,605 || 18–17 || –
|- align="center" bgcolor="ccffcc"
| April 26 || San Diego* || – || Larry H. Miller Field  || BYUtv || 9–1 || Jordan Wood (3–4) || Anthony Donatella (2–4) || None || 1,365 || 19–17 || 8–7
|- align="center" bgcolor="ffbbb"
| April 27 || San Diego* || – || Larry H. Miller Field  || TheW.tv || 6–11 || Paul Richan (3–4) || Hayden Rogers (5–3) || None || 2,035 || 19–18 || 8–8
|- align="center" bgcolor="ffbbb"
| April 28 || San Diego* || – || Larry H. Miller Field  || BYUtv || 5–9 || Chris Murphy (5–4) || Blake Inouye (1–4) || None || 2,367 || 19–19  || 8–9
|-

|- align="center" bgcolor="ffbbb"
|May 1 || at Cal || – || Evans Diamond || P12 || 0–1 || Tanner Dodson (2–0) || Bo Burrup (2–2) || None || 353 || 19–20 || –
|- align="center" bgcolor="ffbbb"
|May 3 || at Saint Mary's* || – || Louis Guisto Field || TheW.tv || 1–2 || Ty Madrigal (2–1) || Blake Inouye (1–5) || None || 108 || 19–21 || 8–10
|- align="center" bgcolor="ffbbb"
|May 4 || at Saint Mary's* || – || Louis Guisto Field || TheW.tv || 3–7 || Ken Waldichuk (8–2) || Hayden Rogers (5–4) || Andrew Hansen (1) || 215 || 19–22 || 8–11
|- align="center" bgcolor="ffbbb"
|May 5 || at Saint Mary's* || – || Louis Guisto Field || TheW.tv || 1–10 || Nick Frank (5–4) || Drew Zimmerman (2–2)' || None || 449 || 19–23 || 8–12
|- align="center" bgcolor="ffbbb"
|May 8 || at Utah || – || Smith's Ballpark || P12 MTN || 3–6 ||  ||  ||  ||  ||  || –
|- align="center" bgcolor="ccffcc"
|May 10 || at San Francisco* || – || Dante Benedetti Diamond at Max Ulrich Field || TheW.tv || 9–2 ||  ||  ||  ||  || – || –
|- align="center" bgcolor="ccffcc"
|May 11 || at San Francisco* || – || Dante Benedetti Diamond at Max Ulrich Field || TheW.tv || 9–7 ||  ||  ||  ||  ||  || –
|- align="center" bgcolor="ffbbb"
|May 12 || at San Francisco* || – || Dante Benedetti Diamond at Max Ulrich Field || TheW.tv || 2–6 ||  ||  ||  ||  ||  || –
|- align="center" bgcolor="ffbbb"
|May 15 || at Stanford || – || Klein Field at Sunken Diamond || P12+ STAN || 1–5 ||  ||  ||  ||  || – || –
|- align="center" bgcolor="ccffcc"
|May 17 || Pacific* || – || Larry H. Miller Field  || BYUtv || 3–1 ||  ||  ||  ||  ||  || –
|- align="center" bgcolor="ffbbb"
|May 18 || Pacific* || – || Larry H. Miller Field  ||BYUtv || 3–9 ||  ||  ||  ||  ||  || –
|- align="center" bgcolor="ffbbb"
|May 19 || Pacific* || – || Larry H. Miller Field  || BYUtv || 5–6 ||  ||  ||  ||  ||  || –
|-

|style="font-size:88%"| Rankings from Collegiate Baseball. Parenthesis indicate tournament seedings.
|-
|style="font-size:88%"| *West Coast Conference games

Rivalries
BYU has two main rivalries on their schedule- the Deseret First Duel vs. Utah and the UCCU Crosstown Clash vs. Utah Valley.

Radio Information
BYU Baseball broadcasts were officially made part of the NuSkin BYU Sports Network broadcast package for the 2018 season. BYU Radio and KOVO will serve as the flagship station with each station carrying most of the games and some exclusives (KOVO has exclusives on Feb 24 (Gm 1), Mar 3, Mar 17, & Mar 31; BYU Radio has exclusives on Mar 8, 9, & 16). Brent Norton returns to provide play-by-play for his 26th consecutive season. Tuckett Slade will provide analysis for most games, but a small selection of former players will also be used.

TV Announcers
Feb 16: Ross PorterFeb 17 (DH): Tuckett SladeFeb 19: Ross PorterFeb 22: Tuckett SladeFeb 23: Brent Norton & Tuckett SladeFeb 24 (Gm 1): Brent Norton & Tuckett SladeFeb 24 (Gm 2): Tuckett SladeMar 2: Brad Law & Mark FullerMar 3 (DH): Brent Norton & Tuckett SladeMar 8: Brent Norton & Tuckett SladeMar 9: Brent Norton & Tuckett SladeMar 10: Dave McCann, Gary Sheide, & Jason Shepherd
Mar. 13: Spencer Linton, Gary Sheide, & Jason ShepherdMar. 15: Brent Norton & Tuckett SladeMar. 16: Brent Norton & Tuckett SladeMar. 17: Spencer Linton, Gary Sheide, & Jason ShepherdMar. 20: Jarom Jordan, Gary Sheide, & Jason ShepherdMar. 22: Roxy Bernstein & Wes ClementsMar. 23: Spencer Linton, Gary Sheide, & Jason ShepherdMar. 24: Dave McCann, Gary Sheide, & Jason ShepherdMar. 27: Jordan Bianucci & Ryan Pickens
Mar. 29: Al Epstein
Mar. 30: Sam Farber, Keith Ramsey, & Sammy O'BrienMar. 31: Al EpsteinApr. 3: Daron Sutton & Ben FranciscoApr. 5: Spencer Linton, Gary Sheide, & Jason ShepherdApr. 6 (Gm 1): Brent Norton & Jeff BillsApr. 6 (Gm 2): Brent Norton & Tuckett SladeApr. 12: No commentaryApr. 13: No commentaryApr. 14: No commentaryApr. 17: Daron Sutton & Ben FranciscoApr. 24: Spencer Linton, Gary Sheide, & Jason ShepherdApr. 26: Spencer Linton, Gary Sheide, & Jason ShepherdApr. 27: Robbie Bullough & Marc Oslund
Apr. 28: Dave McCann, Gary Sheide, & Jason ShepherdMay 1: Ted Robinson & J.T. SnowMay 3: Alex Jensen & Austin LonestarMay 4: George Devine & Alex JensenMay 5: Dean BurnerMay 8: Thad Anderson & Kevin StockerMay 10: Cheyene InmanMay 11: Pat OlsenMay 12: 
May 15: Kevin Danna & Tim Swartz''
May 17: 
May 18: 
May 19:

References 

2018 West Coast Conference baseball season
2018 team
2018 in sports in Utah